Tintomara may refer to:

 A character in the Swedish novel Drottningens juvelsmycke
 Tintomara (film), a 1970 Danish-Swedish film adaptation of the novel Drottningens juvelsmycke

Fictional intersex characters